Annezay is a commune in the Charente-Maritime department in the Nouvelle-Aquitaine region of southwestern France.

The inhabitants of the commune are known as Anneziens or Anneziennes

Geography
Annezay is located some 12 km south-east of Surgères and 16 km north-west of Saint-Jean-d'Angély. Access is by the D118 road from Saint-Crépin in the south-west passing through the west of the commune and continuing north to Chervettes. There is also the D213 from the village east to Saint-Loup. The D107E2 road also passes through the east of the commune from the D107 in the north to Tonnay-Boutonne in the south. Apart from the village there are also the hamlets of Le Grand Vivroux and Le Tramaillou in the commune. Apart from a few small patches of forest the commune is entirely farmland.

There are two small unnamed streams south of the village.

Neighbouring communes and villages

Administration

List of Successive Mayors

Population

Distribution of Age Groups

Percentage Distribution of Age Groups in Annezay and Charente-Maritime Department in 2017

Source: INSEE

Culture and heritage

Religious heritage
The Church of Saint Peter contains a Chasuble, Stole, and Maniple (18th century) that are registered as an historical object.

See also
Communes of the Charente-Maritime department

References

External links
Annezay on the National Geographic Institute website 
Annezay on Géoportail, National Geographic Institute (IGN) website 
Annezay on the 1750 Cassini Map

Communes of Charente-Maritime